Henry, 3rd Earl of Leicester and Lancaster ( – 22 September 1345) was a grandson of King Henry III of England (1216–1272) and was one of the principals behind the deposition of King Edward II (1307–1327), his first cousin.

Origins
He was the younger son of Edmund Crouchback, 1st Earl of Lancaster, Earl of Leicester, a son of King Henry III by his wife Eleanor of Provence. The Earl Henry's mother was Blanche of Artois, Queen Dowager of Navarre.

Henry's elder brother Thomas, 2nd Earl of Lancaster, succeeded their father in 1296, but Henry was summoned to Parliament on 6 February 1298/99 by writ directed to Henrico de Lancastre nepoti Regis ("Henry of Lancaster, nephew of the king", Edward I), by which he is held to have become Baron Lancaster. He took part in the Siege of Caerlaverock in July 1300.

Petition for succession and inheritance
After a period of long-standing opposition to King Edward II and his advisors, including joining two open rebellions, Henry's brother Thomas was convicted of treason, executed and had his lands and titles forfeited in 1322. Henry did not participate in his brother's rebellions; he later petitioned for his brother's lands and titles, and on 29 March 1324 he was invested as Earl of Leicester.

A few years later, shortly after his accession in 1327, the young Edward III of England returned the earldom of Lancaster to him, along with other lordships such as that of Bowland. He may have inherited the Barony of Halton.

Capture and custody of the King
On the Queen's return to England in September 1326 with Roger Mortimer, 1st Earl of March, Henry joined her party against King Edward II, which led to a general desertion of the King's cause and overturned the power of Hugh le Despenser, 1st Earl of Winchester, and his son Hugh the younger.

Henry was sent in pursuit and captured the King at Neath in South Wales. He was appointed to take charge of the King and was responsible for his custody at Kenilworth Castle.

Full restoration and reward
Henry was appointed head of the regency council for the new king, Edward III, and was also appointed captain-general of all the King's forces in the Scottish Marches. He was appointed Constable of Lancaster Castle and High Sheriff of Lancashire in 1327. He helped the young king put an end to Mortimer's regency and tyranny, having him declared a traitor and executed in 1330.

Later life and death
In about the year 1330, he became blind (Prestwich states Henry was going blind around 1329).

Henry spent the last fifteen years of his life at Leicester Castle. There he founded a hospital for the poor and infirm in an extension of the castle bailey. It became known as the Newarke, and Henry was buried in the hospital chapel when he died in 1345. The King and Queen attended his funeral. He was succeeded as Earl of Lancaster and Leicester by his eldest son, Henry of Grosmont, later first Duke of Lancaster. Henry had his father's remains moved to the collegiate Church of the Annunciation of Our Lady of the Newarke, which he had built when he enhanced his father's foundation.

Nickname
According to Jean Le Bel, he was nicknamed Wryneck, or Tors-col in French, possibly due to a medical condition. Froissart repeated that statement in his Chronicles.

Issue
He married Maud Chaworth, before 2 March 1296/1297.

Henry and Maud had seven children:

 Henry of Grosmont, Duke of Lancaster, (–1361)
 Blanche of Lancaster, Baroness Wake of Liddell, (-) married Thomas Wake, 2nd Baron Wake of Liddell
 Maud of Lancaster, (about 1310–1377); married (1) William de Burgh, 3rd Earl of Ulster (died c.1333) and (2) Ralph de Ufford, Justiciar of Ireland (died 1346), and had descendants by both.
 Joan of Lancaster, (about 1312–1345); married John de Mowbray, 3rd Baron Mowbray and had descendants
 Isabel of Lancaster, Abbess of Amesbury, (about 1317 – after 1347)
 Eleanor of Lancaster, (about 1318–1371/72) married (1) John De Beaumont, 2nd Baron Beaumont and (2) 5 Feb 1344/5, Richard FitzAlan, 3rd Earl of Arundel and had descendants.
 Mary of Lancaster, (about 1320–1362), who married Henry de Percy, 3rd Baron Percy, and was the mother of Henry Percy, 1st Earl of Northumberland and had descendants.

Arms
Prior to his restoration to his earldoms, Henry bore the royal arms of King Henry III, differenced by a bend azure. Upon his restoration, his difference changed, to a label France of three points (that is to say a label of three points azure each charged with three fleur-de-lys or.

Ancestry

In fiction
Henry is a supporting character in Les Rois maudits (The Accursed Kings), a series of French historical novels by Maurice Druon.

Notes

References
 
 
 
 
 
 
 

1280s births
1345 deaths
13th-century English nobility
14th-century English nobility
3rd Earl of Leicester
High Sheriffs of Lancashire
House of Plantagenet
Lord High Stewards
English blind people
Blind royalty and nobility
Barons of Halton
Earls of Lancaster